The Northern Military Region (MR N) is a Swedish military region within the Swedish Armed Forces. Established in 2013, the military region staff in based in Boden Garrison. The military region includes Norrbotten County, Västerbotten County, Jämtland County and Västernorrland County.

History
The Northern Military Region was formed on 1 January 2013 as Military Region North, as one of four military regions in Sweden. The military region includes Norrbotten County, Västerbotten County, Jämtland County and Västernorrland County. The region's staff is located in Boden Garrison with the task of leading surveillance and protection tasks, implementing civil-military cooperation and support to society. The Northern Military Region is also responsible for leading the production of the training groups and the Home Guard units in Norrland. The responsibility involves both training personnel for the Home Guard units and leading them in operations. The Northern Military Region's Home Guard battalions are seven in number. On 1 October 2018, a separate command position was appointed for Military Region North. From 2019, the name Northern Military Region was adopted. From 1 January 2020, all military regions are independent units subordinate to the Chief of Home Guard. In doing so, the regions also take over the command in peacetime from the training groups with their Home Guard battalions. Each military region has production management responsibility. This meant that five training groups were transferred to the Northern Military Region. In a government's bill, however, the Swedish government emphasized that the military regional division could be adjusted, depending on the outcome of the investigation Ansvar, ledning och samordning inom civilt försvar ("Responsibility, leadership and coordination in civil defense").

Units

Current units
Fältjägargruppen (FJG)
14th Home Guard Battalion/Fältjägar Battalion
Västernorrlandsgruppen (VNG)
15th Home Guard Battalion/Ångermanland Battalion
16th Home Guard Battalion/Medelpad Battalion
Västerbottensgruppen (VBG)
13th Home Guard Battalion/Västerbotten Battalion
Norrbottensgruppen (NBG)
12th Home Guard Battalion/Norrbotten Battalion
Lapplandsjägargruppen (LJG)
10th Home Guard Battalion/Gränsjägar Battalion
15th Home Guard Battalion/Lapplandsjägar Battalion

Heraldry and traditions

Coat of arms
The coat of arms of the Northern Military Region was previously used by the Northern Military District (Milo N) from 1994 to 2000 and the Northern Military District (MD N) from 2000 to 2005. Blazon: "Azure, the provincial badge of Västerbotten, a reindeer courant, armed gules, followed by a mullet, both argent. The shield surmounted an erect sword or."

Commanding officers
From 2013 to 2017, the military region commander was also commander of the Norrbotten Regiment. From 2018 to 2020, military region commander was subordinate to the Chief of Joint Operations in territorial activities as well as in operations. Furthermore, the military region commander has territorial responsibility over his own military region and leads territorial activities as well as regional intelligence and security services. From 1 January 2020, all military region commanders are subordinate to the Chief of Home Guard.

2013–2014: Colonel Olof Granander
2014–2017: Colonel Mikael Frisell
2018–2018: Colonel Ulf Siverstedt
2018–2021: Colonel Ulf Siverstedt
2021–20xx: Colonel Lars Karlsson

Names, designations and locations

See also
Northern Military District (Milo N)
Northern Military District (MD N)

Footnotes

References

Notes

Print

External links
 

Military regions of Sweden
Military units and formations established in 2013
2013 establishments in Sweden
Boden Garrison